Moomaw may refer to:

Moomaw, Virginia
Moomaw Glacier, a glacier in Rocky Mountain National Park
Lake Moomaw, a lake formed by the Gathright Dam on the Jackson River
Donn Moomaw, an American presbyterian minister

See also
Moomaw Corner, Nebraska